Shlonsky is a Jewish surname. Notable people with the surname include:

 Avraham Shlonsky (1900–1973), Russian Empire–born Israeli poet and editor
 Verdina Shlonsky (1905–1990), Russian Empire–born Israeli composer, pianist, publicist and painter; sister of Abraham

Jewish surnames